Steven Alan Inskeep (born June 16, 1968)  is an American journalist who is currently a host of Morning Edition and Up First on National Public Radio. Prior to being host of Morning Edition, Inskeep covered the Pentagon, the 2000 presidential campaign of George W. Bush, the U.S. Senate, and the wars in Afghanistan and Iraq, and was host of Weekend All Things Considered.

Inskeep is the author of three books: Instant City: Life and Death in Karachi (2011), Jacksonland: President Andrew Jackson, Cherokee Chief John Ross, and a Great American Land Grab (2015), and Imperfect Union: How Jessie and John Fremont Mapped the West, Invented Celebrity, and Helped Cause the Civil War (2020).

Early life and education
Inskeep was raised in Carmel, Indiana, graduated from Carmel High School, and graduated Phi Kappa Phi from Morehead State University in Morehead, Kentucky, in 1990. His first professional experience in radio was a stint as a sportscaster at WMKY-FM in Morehead.

Career

NPR 
Inskeep was hired by NPR in 1996. His first full-time assignment was the 1996 presidential primary in New Hampshire.

In January 2022, Inskeep interviewed former U.S. President Donald Trump on many issues including COVID-19 vaccinations, the 2020 presidential election and the future of the Republican Party, specifically in the 2022 midterm elections. When Inskeep pressured Trump with questions related to the attempts to overturn the election results and the 2021 United States Capitol attack, Trump suddenly hung up the phone interview.

Notable work

Bibliography

Personal life
Inskeep married Carolee Gabel in 1993. They have a daughter who was born in 2005.
In 2012, they adopted a second child from China.  Inskeep himself was also adopted.

References

External links

NPR biography

C-SPAN Q&A interview with Inskeep about Instant City, October 02, 2012
C-SPAN Book Discussion on Instant City, September 23, 2012
Steve Inskeep on Twitter

1968 births
Living people
American radio journalists
Carmel High School (Indiana) alumni
NPR personalities
Morehead State University alumni
People from Carmel, Indiana
American scholars of Pakistan studies
Journalists from Washington, D.C.